The hizzle may refer to:

In botany
The Haze or Purple Haze strain of Marijuana.
In vernacular
An African-American Vernacular English substrated, -izzle-pattern slang term meaning cool, also used as conversational and improvisationally-rhythmic conversational and lyrical filler.